Huish derives from the Old English word hīwisc meaning "household", and may be a place name element or a surname.

People
Huish (surname)

Places
Huish, Torridge, Devon, England, UK; near Merton
Huish, North Devon District, Devon, England, UK; a location near Instow
Huish, Wiltshire, England, UK

Other uses
Huish Athletic Ground, former ground of Yeovil Town F.C., Somerset, England
Huish Park, current ground of Yeovil Town F.C.

See also

Huish Champflower, Somerset, England, UK
Huish Episcopi, Somerset, England, UK
North Huish, Devon, England, UK
South Huish, Devon, England, UK
Hardenhuish School, Chippenham, Wiltshire, UK
Rodhuish Common, Somerset, UK